Me Amarás may refer to:

 Me Amarás (album), a 1993 album by Ricky Martin
 "Me Amarás" (song), a 1993 single by Ricky Martin